Janion is a surname. Notable people with the surname include:

Jeremy Janion (born 1946), British rugby union player
Maria Janion (1926–2020), Polish scholar, critic, and theoretician of literature